The Voivodeship of Maramureș (or ), was a Romanian voivodeship centered in the region of the same name within the Kingdom of Hungary. It was the most powerful Romanian entity in or around Transylvania during its time. The Voivodeship of Maramureș was established in 1343. It was ultimately disestablished around 1402 and supplanted with Máramaros County.

The Voivodeship of Maramureș was subdivided into the keneziates of Bârjava, Bogdăneștilor (at the valley of the Tisza and Vișeu rivers), Câmpulung, Cosău, Mara, Talabor and Varalia. Two noblemen from the voivodeship, Dragoș and Bogdan were crucial in the founding of the Principality of Moldavia and overthrowing Hungarian rule east of the Carpathians, respectively.

Background 

Maramureș, a mountainous region west of the Carpathian Mountains, had likely been included in the Kingdom of Hungary from an early date, even if only as part of the gyepű [hu], a sparsely populated no man's land, which could take multiple days of walking to cross, located behind the border fortifications themselves. Maramureș itself is mentioned in Hungarian documents for the first time in 1199, as a royal forest of King Emeric I. The area remained sparsely populated, not surpassing 8,000 inhabitants until the thirteenth century, after the Mongol Invasion and subsequent repopulation of Hungary.

The first settlements granted town privileges in the region were Visk, Huszt, Técső and Hosszúmező in 1329, followed by future regional capital Máramarossziget in 1352.

Activities of the Bogdănești 

The Vlachs were granted the right in the Vlach law to order themselves by their own tradition in cases where they were particularly populous, even voivodes to serve as regional leaders. While Vlach communities in the regions surrounding Maramureș also elected their own voivodes, it was only in Maramureș where they could translate their authority from cultural to territorial. They practiced their own faith and lived periphery of cities, but were important in the urban affairs. For military services, the king granted their knezes and voivodes possession over villages they have established. The knezes also fulfilled the job of organizing the settlement and handing over the tax. A diploma issued in 1485 by Queen Beatrice talking about a certain Vlach priest named Lawrence shows that the Romanians in Maramureș owed religious service to the Huszt castle. The Vlachs were particular in a sense that they lived in symbiosis with the arriving Rusyns.

The first document indicating that Vlachs crossed into Maramureș is from the 1320s. One group was led by brothers Dragoș and Drag, and another by Borzan.

In 1334, threatened by the Serbian expansion, an important Vlach group from the Balkans entered into Hungary under 9 months led by their voivode Bogdan. Bogdan became Voivode of Maramureș and set his center near Iza, in the city of Konyha (today both part of Bogdan Vodă). After the death of King Charles I of Hungary, he became disloyal to the Hungarian king and was mentioned in a 1343 diploma as "former Voivode of Maramureș  who became unfaithful to the king" Bogdan entered conflicts with Crăciun of Bilke around the time of the loss of his voivode title and, notably, with the loyalist Giulești family, whom he and his nephew Stephen attempted to expel from their estates in 1349, prompting King Louis I to request the Giulești's reinstatement from Stephen's brother Ioan (John), who had succeeded the family of Codrea of Hosszúmező as voivode. We also know about conflicts with the non-Romanian population along the Maros river. In 1353, Bogdan's estate was split between him and his nephews. Around this time, a number of Maramureș Romanians contributed to the Hungarian expeditions against the Golden Horde, culminating the naming of one Dragoș as head of the newly established March of Moldavia. Maramureș and Moldavia were closely linked in the latter's first years, with Dragoș of Giulești leading an expedition to pacify Romanian unrest around 1360. After the death of Sas of Moldavia, Bogdan seized this opportunity to secretly cross the Carpathians in 1359 and evict Sas' son, Balc from Moldavia, with or without the knowledge of his nephew and former collaborator Stephen, now voivode in Maramureș. The reasons for his exodus are not precisely known, but the disgrace he had suffered from the king's hand by the loss of his title must have contributed. He settled in Moldavia with his people, becoming Bogdan I of Moldavia, the first independent ruler of the country.

Maramureș under the Drăgoșești 

Balc, having suffered heavy losses to his family and retinue, as well as grave injuries to himself, started a migration into Máramaros, where King Louis I granted him and his brother Drag the confiscated estates of Bogdan and the Voivodeship of Maramureș, title of which the Bogdănești had been deprived, on 2 February 1365. Throughout the following years, the so far uninhabited northern mountains of Transylvania were speedily repopulated with Romanian commoners.  The Maramureș forces contributed to Hungarian campaigns in Bulgaria and Halych, netting the voivodes considerable favor with the crown. Following this, the brothers were granted a number of titles. By 1388, they were Counts of the Székelys, Ugocsa, Szatmár and Máramaros. The Hungarian Kings intended for this to be a way of eroding the autonomy of their Kingdom's outer reaches by having authority come from the county granted by the king, rather than the elevated local ruler. In Maramureș, this period is marked by the development of large villages in the region, as the voivodes centralised their holdings, Balc and Drag coming to directly administer over 30 settlements in the region. By 1391, the two brothers had built a church at Peri, for which they requested and received the status of Stauropegion, as they were of the Eastern Orthodox faith, rather than Roman Catholic like the near-entirety of the Hungarian nobility at the time. Such endeavours have been viewed as attempts to establish a nucleus for a new, larger voivodeship, similar in status to the neighbouring Transylvania.

In the second half of the 14th century, multiple settlements inhabited mostly by Romanians were recorded. In 1345, Szarvaszó (Sarasău) was ruled by Aprusa and Marus. Julius, son of Dragoș held Gyulafalva from before 1349. In 1360, Peter's son Stan inherited Felsőróna (Rona de Sus), interestingly not as a keneziate, but by noble right. In 1363, Fejéregyház was gained by Balc, Drag and John. According to a diploma of King Sigismund issued in 1407, Felsőapsa (Верхнє Водяне, Apşa de Sus), Középapsa (Середнє Водяне, Apşa de Mijloc) and Alsóapsa (Нижня Апша, Apşa de Jos) was gained by the Vlachs during the reign of King Louis I.

Downfall 
Drag died around the end of the year 1400. At the same time, unrest was brewing among the Hungarian nobility against King Sigismund of Luxembourg, who remained King of Hungary in spite of the death of his wife, Mary, in 1395, which was closely followed by a military defeat against the Ottomans at Nikopol the following year. By the time of his return in 1401, the nobility, led by his chancellor, John Kanizsai, Archbishop of Esztergom, was prepared to depose him. It seems that Balc took their side in this endeavour, as multiple complaints were leveled against his family after the King's eventual defeat of the plotters. Balc had predeceased these developments, as he is first referred to as "the late Master Balk" in a document from June 25 1402. This fatal blow to the voivodal polity may have occurred violently, in connection to the battles in the spring of 1402, or not, as Balc was of advanced age, having been the older of the two brothers. Whichever the case, no new voivode for all of Maramureș seems to have been chosen, as his descendants were left with a small estate in Szatmár County.

Legacy 
The title of voivode would never regain the importance it had before 1402, being restricted to smaller areas in an increasingly ethnically diverse region, as former knezes reclaimed their domains during an influx of southwards Ruthenian movement. Throughout the 15th century, a number of Vlach noble families converted to Catholicism and adopted Hungarian customs. Among them was an offshoot of the Drăgoșesti, headed by a son of Drag, which would eventually become the Drágffy of Béltek family, a member of which would eventually hold the dignity of Voivode of Transylvania. These developments paved the way for the complete dissolution of Vlach rights in Hungary after the Peasant Revolt in Transylvania and their exclusion from the region's administration, as the Saxon, Hungarian and Székely nobility formed the Unio Trium Nationum. In Moldavia, the element from Maramureș was quickly overwhelmed, however, the Aurochs' head, considered by some to have been brought into Moldavia from Maramureș remained its symbol.

See also
 History of Maramureș
 Máramaros County
 Maramureș
 Northern Maramureș
 Maramureș County

References

Citations

Bibliography

History of Maramureș
Medieval Moldavia
Romania in the Early Middle Ages
History of Carpathian Ruthenia
Medieval Kingdom of Hungary
Former countries in Europe
States and territories disestablished in the 14th century